Eumegamys is an extinct genus of dinomyid rodent from the late Miocene and Pliocene of Brazil (Solimões Formation), Venezuela (Urumaco Formation, Urumaco) and Argentina (Ituzaingó Formation) in South America.
Its skull was 50 cm (1.64 ft) long.

References

Further reading 
 McKenna, Malcolm C., and Bell, Susan K. 1997. Classification of Mammals Above the Species Level. Columbia University Press, New York, 631 pp. 

Prehistoric pacaranas
Prehistoric rodent genera
Miocene rodents
Pliocene rodents
Miocene first appearances
Pliocene extinctions
Miocene mammals of South America
Pliocene mammals of South America
Uquian
Chapadmalalan
Montehermosan
Huayquerian
Neogene Argentina
Fossils of Argentina
Ituzaingó Formation
Neogene Brazil
Fossils of Brazil
Neogene Venezuela
Fossils of Venezuela
Fossil taxa described in 1926